Jack Whetton (born 24 May 1992) is a New Zealand Rugby Union player who currently plays as a lock for the NSW Waratahs in Super Rugby AU.

His performances caught the attention of the  Super Rugby franchise who wanted to contract him to their wider training group for the 2013 Super Rugby season.

Whetton comes from a family with a rich rugby tradition. His father Gary played 180 games for Auckland and 58 for the All Blacks and is the chairman of the Blues franchise. His uncle Alan also played 65 tests for the All Blacks and spent 12 years with Auckland.

He qualifies for Australia through his grandfather.

On 2 December 2014, Whetton signed a short-term deal with Leicester Tigers until the end of the season. On 5 June 2015, Whetton signed for third division French club USO Nevers in Federale 1  during the 2015-16 season. Whetton returned to England to sign for Yorkshire Carnegie in the RFU Championship on a two-year contract, where he found his level playing his best rugby.

References

External links
 

1992 births
New Zealand rugby union players
New Zealand people of Australian descent
Auckland rugby union players
Northland rugby union players
ACT Brumbies players
Leicester Tigers players
Leeds Tykes players
Highlanders (rugby union) players
Rugby union locks
Rugby union players from Auckland
People educated at Rosmini College
Living people
New South Wales Waratahs players
USON Nevers players
Castres Olympique players